is a terminal railway station on the Misumi Line, operated by Kyushu Railway Company in Uki, Kumamoto, Japan.

Lines

Station layout
The station consists of one side platform.

History
The station opened on 25 December 1899. With the privatization of Japanese National Railways (JNR) on 1 April 1987, the station came under the control of JR Kyushu.

Surrounding area
 Misumi Port

See also
 List of railway stations in Japan

References

External links

  

Railway stations in Kumamoto Prefecture
Stations of Kyushu Railway Company
Railway stations in Japan opened in 1899